Chankalamakhi (Dargwa: ЧIянкIаламахьи) is a rural locality (a selo) in Akushinsky Selsoviet, Akushinsky  District, Republic of Dagestan, Russia. The population was 381 as of 2010.

Geography 
Chankalamakhi is located 3 km east of Akusha (the district's administrative centre) by road. Inzimakhi is the nearest rural locality.

References 

Rural localities in Akushinsky District